The Theater am Hechtplatz is a theatre in the German-speaking Switzerland situated at Limmatquai in Zürich. Founded in 1959 as a Cabaret, it's owned and provided by the government of the city of Zürich.

History 
To give a solid performance venue to the Swiss cabaret, Theater am Hechtplatz was founded on the initiative of Dionysius Gurny, secretary of Emil Landolt, then the mayor of the city of Zürich. On 25 April 1959 the opening took place with the program "Eusi chliini city" by the Cabaret Fédéral. The city loaned the theater to Otto Weissert, director of the Cabaret Fédéral, under the preserve that it had to serve temporarily as a second stage of Schauspielhaus Zürich. Schauspielhaus soon suspended for financial reasons, the Cabaret Fédéral was resolved, and Weissert was appointed as director of Schauspielhaus. In 1961 the operation of the theater was therefore associated to a department of the Zürich mayor's office, the present Präsidialdepartement; since 1971 the theater is subsidized by the city of Zürich.

Headed by Gurny, Felix Rogner, Rudolf Sauser, Nicolas Baerlocher and Dominik Flaschka, the theater became one of the main stages for cabaret in Switzerland. In guest performances of varying length, it shows mainly domestic, but also cabaret of artists from outside of Switzerland, among others by Alfred Rasser, César Keiser and Margrit Läubli, Franz Hohler, Georg Kreisler, Kaspar Fischer, Joachim Rittmeyer, and Lorenz Keiser. Chanson, folklore, pantomime and clowns, as Dmitri and Gardi Hutter and puppet theater. A second program focus form – often as equity or co-productions – musicals, and comedies by Swiss authors, among them Ursula Schaeppi, Jörg Schneider, Hans Gmür and Peter Zeindler, with popular Swiss actresses and actors, such as Ruedi Walter, Walter Roderer, Ines Torelli, Stephanie Glaser and Anne-Marie Blanc. Children's shows such as guest performances by the Zürcher Märchenbühne, literary matinees and jazz concerts, are also part of the small theater's program.

Facilities 

The theater is located at the small Hechtplatz square on the upper Limmatquai, opposite of the Bauschänzli respectively Frauenbad Stadthausquai, near the present Bellevueplatz in Zürich. It was built by Leohnard Zeugherr as a one-story commercial building to house shops and small business in 1835, later it was used as a fire station at the Limmatquai. In 1958/59 it was rebuilt by Ernst Gisel in a theatre with adjacent café/bar, since 1981 the theater is a listed building. Its exterior was renewed and the foyer was rebuilt by Martin Spühler in 1987. The theater houses a proscenium stage (7m x 3,6m/5.8,m x 4.8m) with an auditorium that haves a seating capacity of up to 260 spectators.

Zürcher Märchenbühne 

As well as the Bernhard-Theater in 1961/63, it also houses the Zürcher Märchenbühne which annually produces a fairy tale for children during the winter months, starring among others Vincenzo Biagi, Paul Bühlmann, Inigo Gallo, Walter Andreas Müller, Bella Neri, Margrit Rainer, Jörg Schneider, Peter W. Staub, Schaggi Streuli, Ines Torelli, Erich Vock and Ruedi Walter.

Directors

Cultural heritage 
The theatre respectively building is listed in the Swiss inventory of cultural property of national and regional significance as a Class B object of regional importance.

Literature 
 Nicolas Baerlocher and Dominik Flaschka (publisher): Jetzt erst Hecht: 50 Jahre Theater am Hechtplatz. NZZ Libro, Zürich 2009, .

References

External links

  
 Zürcher Märchenbühne 

Theatres in Zürich
District 1 of Zürich
Culture of Zürich
1959 establishments in Switzerland
Theatres completed in 1959
Buildings and structures completed in 1835
19th-century architecture in Switzerland
20th-century architecture in Switzerland